The 2016 British motorcycle Grand Prix was the twelfth round of the 2016 Grand Prix motorcycle racing season. It was held at the Silverstone Circuit in Silverstone on 4 September 2016.

MotoGP race report
Maverick Viñales took his first victory in MotoGP and the first since the 2014 Malaysian Moto2 round. This race marked Suzuki's first victory since the 2007 French Grand Prix.

Classification

MotoGP
The race was red-flagged on the first lap due to an accident involving Loris Baz and Pol Espargaró; for the subsequent restart, the race distance was shortened from 20 to 19 laps.

Moto2

Moto3

Championship standings after the race (MotoGP)
Below are the standings for the top five riders and constructors after round twelve has concluded.

Riders' Championship standings

Constructors' Championship standings

 Note: Only the top five positions are included for both sets of standings.

Notes

References

British
Motorcycle Grand Prix
British motorcycle Grand Prix
British